A Step in the Right Direction is a 1981 Australian TV movie about a love story between the son of a factory owner and the factory employee.

References

External links

Australian television films
1981 television films
1981 films
Films directed by Di Drew
Australian Broadcasting Corporation original programming